Frank Polaski (December 19, 1904 – July 1, 1996) was a Democratic member of the Pennsylvania House of Representatives.

Early life and education
He graduated from the University of Michigan with a Bachelor of Arts in 1929 and Northwestern University School of Law with a Juris Doctor in 1933. He served in the United States Army Air Forces from April 1942 to October 1945 and became a staff sergeant.

Career
He was first elected in 1964, bringing a keen awareness of the needs of working people and of the environment to his legislative responsibilities. He introduced the first legislation to protect the waters of Pennsylvania and to provide funds to clean up existing water pollution. He introduced and enacted legislation for economic development in the State and the Erie area during a time of economic restructuring. He initiated legislation supporting public housing and measures upgrading facilities of Edinboro State College and Behrend Campus of Pennsylvania State University. He sponsored legislation supporting civil rights, student loans and scholarships, consumers' rights, and Vietnam War veterans' bonuses and was among the first in the Pennsylvania legislature to advocate using dedicated resources from the Pennsylvania Lottery to support programs and services to senior citizens. After his retirement he was active with the Emmaus Soup Kitchen and the Second Harvest Food Bank of Northwest Pennsylvania.

He is buried at Trinity Cemetery, Erie, Pennsylvania.

References

1904 births
1996 deaths
20th-century American politicians
Burials in Pennsylvania
Democratic Party members of the Pennsylvania House of Representatives
Northwestern University Pritzker School of Law alumni
Politicians from Erie, Pennsylvania
United States Army Air Forces non-commissioned officers
University of Michigan alumni